The Tipsport Hockey Cup is the national ice hockey cup competition in the Czech Republic. It was first played as the Zepter Hockey Cup in 2000.

Champions

Titles by team

External links
Tipsport Hockey Cup on eurohockey.com

Czech
Ice hockey competitions in the Czech Republic